Hind Al-Eryani is a Yemeni activist and journalist. She advocates for women's rights, LGBTQ+, and peace in Yemen, and has written many articles in support of the topics. She has also fought against khat, a drug-like substance.

Hind also advocated for the release of the Baha'is minority in Yemen.  She worked closely with UN special envoy Martin Griffiths and Houthi leaders to secure the release of the six Baha'is.  

Her journalism caused her to have to seek asylum from Turkey to Sweden.

She is currently a member of the UN Women's Yemeni Women Pact for Peace & Security.

Awards
In 2017, she won the Arab Woman of the Year Award for Achievement in Public Awareness.

References 

Yemeni women activists
Yemeni women's rights activists
Yemeni human rights activists
Living people
Year of birth missing (living people)
Yemeni emigrants to Sweden